St. Paul's German Evangelical Church was the first German Evangelical Church to be established in Louisville, Kentucky, USA. It was founded in 1836 by Reverend George Brandau.

References

Churches completed in 1906
20th-century Protestant churches
Churches in Louisville, Kentucky
German-American culture in Louisville, Kentucky
Local landmarks in Louisville, Kentucky
National Register of Historic Places in Louisville, Kentucky
Churches on the National Register of Historic Places in Kentucky
1838 establishments in Kentucky
Religious organizations established in 1838
1906 establishments in Kentucky
Gothic Revival church buildings in Kentucky